Ek Se Badhkar Ek is a 1976 Hindi movie, with action, comedy and drama. The story is about two brothers who were separated and both became thieves. There was big competition between the police and thugs to steal a diamond worth a million. There are suspenses one after another. Finally, the diamond was stolen and it had gone missing from hand to hand, until discovered with much effort by the heroes. Directed by Brij, The film stars Ashok Kumar, Raaj Kumar, Navin Nischol and Sharmila Tagore. The film's music is by Kalyanji-Anandji.

The film was a big hit with it story line. Navin Nischol was at his peak when the movie was made. The role of Raaj Kumar as hero was without a heroine. Sharmila Tagore has proven that she is a multi-talented actress in the movie with her role. Anwar Hussain is the head of thugs with Helen being his lead lady. Ashok Kumar's role in the movie was considered one of his best.

The bhangra song of the movie by Kishore Kumar and Lata Mangeshkar, became very popular. In the movie, Mohammed Rafi and Asha Bhosle have sung a Qawwali for Ashok Kumar and Padma Khanna (in a guest appearance), which was a gem. Some part of the Qawwali and lyrics were used by R. D. Burman in the film Hum Kisise Kum Naheen for the song "Hai Agar Dushman". Due to the success of the movie, it was remade in Telugu as Mugguru Muggure.

Cast
Ashok Kumar as Raja
Raaj Kumar as Shankar
Navin Nischol as ACP Rajesh Verma
Sharmila Tagore as Rekha
Deven Verma as Constable Lurkuram
Helen as Rita

Music

References

External links 
 

1976 films
1970s Hindi-language films
Films scored by Kalyanji Anandji
Hindi films remade in other languages
Films directed by Brij Sadanah